Chakoram (English: Pheasant) is a 1994 Malayalam romantic drama film written by A. K. Lohithadas and directed by M. A. Venu. The film stars Shanthi Krishna and Murali in the lead roles along with Philomina, Kuthiravattom Pappu, Mamukkoya, Cochin Hanifa and Sudheesh in other pivotal roles. The music for the film was composed by Johnson.

Shanthi Krishna won the Kerala State Film Award for Best Actress for her role as Sharadammini, and Venu won the Kerala State Film Award for Best Debut Director.

Plot
The film is about an arrogant and bold spinster, in her thirties, whose life turns upside-down with the arrival of an ex-army-man in the neighbourhood.

Cast
 Shanthi Krishna as Sharadammini
 Murali as Lance Naik Mukundan Menon
 Philomina as Amminiyamma
 Kuthiravattom Pappu as Ammama
 Mamukkoya as Pookunju
 Cochin Haneefa as Sreedharan Kartha
 Sudheesh as Unni
 Santhakumari
 Bobby Kottarakkara as Govindankutty
 Ottapalam Pappan
 Reshmi Soman as Sunanda
 Anila Sreekumar

Soundtrack 
Soundtrack was composed by 	Johnson and lyrics were penned by Kaithapram

References

External links

1994 films
1990s Malayalam-language films
Films scored by Johnson
1994 romantic drama films
Indian romantic drama films
Films with screenplays by A. K. Lohithadas
1994 directorial debut films